John Herbert "Jack" Heinrich,  (born December 20, 1936) was a commercial and real estate lawyer and political figure in British Columbia. He represented Prince George North in the Legislative Assembly of British Columbia from 1979 to 1986 as a Social Credit member.

He was born in Mission, British Columbia and was educated there and at the University of British Columbia. In 1962, he married Linda Strachan. Heinrich lived in Prince George. He served in the provincial cabinet as Minister of Labour, Minister of Municipal Affairs, Minister of Education and Minister of Forests. In 1986, he was named Queen's Counsel.

References 

1936 births
British Columbia Social Credit Party MLAs
Canadian King's Counsel
Corporate lawyers
Lawyers in British Columbia
Living people
Members of the Executive Council of British Columbia
People from Mission, British Columbia
People from Prince George, British Columbia
Real property lawyers
University of British Columbia alumni